"Will You Be There" is a song by German recording artist Jeanette. It was written by Frank Johnes, Tom Remm, and Kristina Bach and produced by Cobra for her debut studio album Enjoy! (2000). Released as the album's second single, it reached the top thirty of the German Singles Chart.

Formats and track listings

Charts

References

2001 songs
Jeanette Biedermann songs
Universal Music Group singles
Songs written by Kristina Bach